Xinjiang Chalkis Company Ltd is a major Chinese agricultural company that processes tomatoes and fruits, founded in 1994. It also produces conical barrels and wooden ton-boxes. It is headquartered in Urumqi, Xinjiang, China.

Officers
Chairman of the Board - Zeng Chao as of 27 May 2013
Vice Chairman of the Board  - Wu Ming as of 27 May 2013

References

External links
Company official site
Introduction from Famous Brand Fostered and Promoted by MOFCOM
Page in businessweek

Multinational food companies
Food and drink companies of China
Companies based in Xinjiang
Government-owned companies of China